Donald or Don Sharp or Sharpe may refer to:

Donald Sharpe (1875–1966), Canadian politician in Ontario
Don Sharp (1921–2011), Australian-born British film director
Don Sharpe (1929–2004), British sound editor
Don Sharp (golfer), in the Lake Macquarie Amateur
Don Sharpe (producer), producer of the 1969 Japanese film Latitude Zero
Don Sharp (karateka), of the Japan Karate Association